David Bradford is a Canadian poet based in Montreal, Quebec, whose debut poetry collection Dream of No One But Myself was published in 2021.

He is a graduate of the University of Guelph, where he was mentored by Dionne Brand. He previously published the chapbooks Nell Zink is Damn Free (2017) and The Plot (2018), and was a founding editor of the poetry publisher House House Press.

Dream of No One But Myself was shortlisted for the 2022 Griffin Poetry Prize, the 2022 Gerald Lampert Award, and the Governor General's Award for English-language poetry at the 2022 Governor General's Awards.

References

21st-century Canadian poets
21st-century Canadian male writers
Canadian male poets
Black Canadian writers
University of Guelph alumni
Writers from Montreal
Living people
Year of birth missing (living people)